Rose Slivka (January 9, 1919 – September 2, 2004) was an American poet and writer for women's magazines in the twentieth century. From 1959 to 1979 she was the editor-in-chief for Craft Horizons (now American Craft Magazine).

Early life 
Born in New York City, Slivka obtained her degree in English from Hunter College in 1941.

Work on Craft Horizons 
Slivka is notable for shifting Craft Horizons magazine away from technical articles towards more professional and critical writing that included contributions from many outside the field. While serving as editor-in-chief at Craft Horizons, Slivka published The New Ceramic Presence in 1961, which the American Craft Council called "groundbreaking."

References

1919 births
2004 deaths
American magazine editors
Women magazine editors
Writers from New York City
Hunter College alumni